John Ike Ibeh (born April 16, 1986) is a Nigerian footballer who plays as a left midfielder. He played for several seasons in the Romanian Liga I.

Club career
Ibeh previously played at Hapoel Tel Aviv in Israel, AFC, in Netherlands and UT Arad from Romania. Ibeh holds Spanish citizenship. He began his career at Hapoel Tel Aviv and moved in 2005 to AFC. After two years he left Amsterdam and moved for 600.000 € to UTA Arad. He signed for Oțelul Galați in early 2009.

In the 2010-2011 he won the Romanian Championship with Oțelul Galați, playing in 9 games and scoring once. In the 2011-2012 UEFA Champions League he played 2 games for Oțelul Galați in the group stage. In the middle of the 2011-2012 Liga I season he moved to Pandurii Târgu Jiu.

Honours

Club
Oțelul Galați
Liga I: 2010–11
Supercupa României: 2011

Pandurii
Liga I: runner-up 2013

References

External links
 
 Player Profile
 Chiefs Assess Young Nigerian Ibeh
 

1986 births
Living people
Nigerian footballers
Igbo sportspeople
Association football midfielders
Nigerian expatriate footballers
AFC DWS players
FC UTA Arad players
ASC Oțelul Galați players
CS Pandurii Târgu Jiu players
Liga I players
Aris Thessaloniki F.C. players
Super League Greece players
Expatriate footballers in Romania
Expatriate footballers in the Netherlands
Nigerian expatriate sportspeople in Romania
Nigerian expatriate sportspeople in the Netherlands
Sportspeople from Port Harcourt